Central Avenue Bridge may refer to:

Central Avenue Bridge (Batesville, Arkansas), listed on the NRHP in Arkansas
Central Avenue Bridge (Kansas City, Kansas)
Central Avenue Bridge (Minneapolis)